John James Morrell McMullan (23 April 1893 – 28 April 1967) was a New Zealand cricketer who played 32 games of first-class cricket for Otago from 1918 to 1930.

Life and career
A batsman and occasional wicket-keeper, McMullan made his first-class debut against Southland in 1917–18. Batting at number four, he made 157 not out, including 22 fours, of the team's total of 313. Otago won by an innings. In his next first-class match, against Wellington two years later, he made 85 not out and 25. He thus scored 267 runs in his first-class career before being dismissed, setting a world first-class record which was not broken until 1946, when Sam Loxton scored 305 runs before being dismissed. 

The rest of his career was steady, and included two more centuries, both in the Plunket Shield: 111 against Wellington in 1923–24 (one of seven centuries in the match) and 131 (after 51 in the first innings) against Auckland in 1927–28. In 1923 the Otago Daily Times described him thus: "Left-hand bat of the 'rock' order. Has to be dug out; also a fine field." In the 1930s he served on the selection panel for the Otago team; during the Second World War he was the sole selector. He also coached young players in Dunedin.

McMullan was awarded a BA in History by New Zealand University in 1920. He was headmaster of the Tainui School in Dunedin until 1945, when he became headmaster of George Street School, also in Dunedin.

References

External links

1893 births
1967 deaths
Otago cricketers
New Zealand cricketers
Cricketers from Dunedin
University of New Zealand alumni
New Zealand schoolteachers
Heads of schools in New Zealand